The Boulder River is a river in the U.S. state of Washington.

Course
The Boulder River originates in the Cascade Range, from the slopes of Three Fingers, Mount Bullen, and Whitehorse Mountain. It flows northwest and then northeast through a portion of Boulder River Wilderness to join the Stillaguamish River. The Stillaguamish empties into Port Susan, part of Puget Sound. The river's source is the Craig Lakes, two remote lakes located high on the slopes of Three Fingers.  After exiting the lakes the river plunges over Craig Lakes Falls as it descends into the Boulder River Wilderness.

The river flows northwest from there and just as it is turning northeast it tumbles over very bouldery Boulder Falls.  The river also flows over one more waterfall, Half Mile Falls, before the river makes its final push toward its confluence with the North Fork Stillaguamish River.

Tributaries 

Gerkman Creek
Ditney Creek

See also

List of rivers of Washington
Boulder River Waterfalls
Boulder River Wilderness

References

Rivers of Washington (state)
Rivers of Snohomish County, Washington